This is a list of favelas in Brazil. This Portuguese word is commonly used in Brazil.

Minas Gerais
 Belo Horizonte
 Aglomerado da Serra
 Morro do Papagaio
 Acaba Mundo

Santa Catarina
 Florianópolis
 Monte Cristo

Rio de Janeiro
 Niterói
 Grota do Surucucu
 Morro do Estado
 Rio de Janeiro (for a complete list, see the Portuguese WikiPedia article: Lista de favelas da cidade do Rio de Janeiro)
 Babilônia
 Benjamin Constant
 Cajueiro
 Cantagalo–Pavão–Pavãozinho
Chácara do Céu
 Chapéu Mangueira
 Cidade de Deus
Complexo do Lins
 Complexo da Maré
 Complexo do Alemão
 Santa Marta
 Jacarezinho
 Ladeira dos Tabajaras
 Mangueira
 Manguinhos
 Mineira
 Morro Azul
 Morro da Babilônia
 Morro do Borel
 Morro dos Cabritos
 Morro do Cantagalo
 Morro dos Macacos
 Morro da Providência
 Rocinha
 Salgueiro
 Serrinha
 Tavares Bastos
 Tuiuti
 Vidigal
 Vila do João
 Vigário Geral
 Vila Cruzeiro
 Vila Parque da Cidade
 Vila Pereira da Silva (Pereirão)

São Paulo 
 São Paulo (for a complete list, see the article in the Portuguese WikiPedia)
 Heliópolis
 Paraisópolis
 Vila Nova Jaguaré
 Radar (favela)
 Vietnã
 Favela da Alba
 Buraco Quente
 Morro do Piolho
 Azul
 Nega Rose
 Dom Macario
 Mauro
 Mario Cardim
 Campinho
 Peri

Pernambuco
Recife
Brasília Teimosa
Vila de Deus
Iraque
Ilha das Cobras (favela), Recife
Ilha Joana Bezerra
Alto dos Milagres
Suvaco da Cobra
Linha do Metro — (also known as Coque)
Entra a Pulso
Olinda
Comunidade V8
Ilha do Rato— (also Known as Ilha do Santana)
Ilha do Maruim

Bahia
Alagados (in Salvador)

See also
 List of slums

References

 Secretaria Municipal do Habitat: List of Rio de Janeiro Favelas

 

Brazil
Favelas